Lakeland, Indiana was an incorporated town in LaPorte County, Indiana that was annexed into Michigan City on January 4, 1960.  It had about 3000 inhabitants at the time of its annexation.

References

Former municipalities in Indiana